Niklas Andersen (born 4 August 1988) is a German former professional footballer who played as a left-back. He is the son of Jørn Andersen.

Career
Andersen played in the youth system of Hamburger SV, Eintracht Frankfurt and Schalke 04. He moved often, due to following his father and coach, Jørn Andersen. In 2005, he gained a foothold in Rot-Weiss Essen's A youth team and was called up in the last season for the Regionalliga team. For the 2008–09 season Andersen moved to Bundesliga club Werder Bremen where he signed a contract running until 30 June 2012. Andersen made his debut for the Werder Bremen senior team on 13 May 2009. He was substituted on in the 77th minute for Frank Baumann in a 0–5 away win against Eintracht Frankfurt. He was released by Werder in June 2011, and spent part of the summer with Charlton Athletic but did not do enough to win a deal so he signed for Chemnitzer FC half a season later, spending a year with the club before leaving on a free transfer.

Personal life
He is the son of former Norway international footballer and Bundesliga top scorer Jørn Andersen.

References

External links
 

1988 births
Living people
German footballers
Germany youth international footballers
Rot-Weiss Essen players
SV Werder Bremen players
SV Werder Bremen II players
Chemnitzer FC players
SG Wattenscheid 09 players
Association football defenders
Bundesliga players
3. Liga players
German people of Norwegian descent
Footballers from Frankfurt